John Butler (died 1766), known as John Butler of Kilcash, a member of the Irish landed gentry, was de jure 15th Earl of Ormond and 8th Earl of Ossory. He did not assume these titles as he thought them forfeit by the attainder of the 2nd Duke of Ormond. He did, however, inherit the Ormond estate from the 1st Earl of Arran through Arran's sister Amelia. In 1791, the title of Earl of Ormond would be successfully claimed by his cousin, the 17th Earl.

Birth and origins 

John was born about 1720, probably at Kilcash Castle, his parents' habitual residence. He was the third but only surviving son of Thomas Butler of Garryricken and his wife Margaret Magennis. His father belonged to a cadet branch of the Butler Dynasty, being the grandson and heir of Richard Butler of Kilcash, who was the younger brother of James Butler, 1st Duke of Ormond. The Butlers were Old English and descended from Theobald Walter, who had been appointed Chief Butler of Ireland by King Henry II in 1177.

John's mother was the eldest daughter of William Burke, 7th Earl of Clanricarde and widow of Bryan Magennis, 5th Viscount of Iveagh. His parents were both Catholic. They had married in 1696. John had two brothers and five sisters, which are listed in his father's article.

Inheritances and successions 
In 1738 his father died. John inherited Kilcash and other parts of the lands of Garryricken Manor, which had been created for his grandfather Richard Butler of Kilcash shortly after 1639 and had been divided between his father and his uncle John, who held Garryricken House itself. He did not inherit any title as his father held none.

In 1758, on the death of the 1st Earl of Arran, his father's second cousin, he unknowingly became de jure the 15th Earl of Ormond. It had been believed that all the titles of James Butler, 2nd Duke of Ormond became forfeit in 1715. However, in 1791, it would be found that the title of "Earl of Ormond" (and its subsidiary titles) in the peerage of Ireland had merely lain dormant and so could be successfully revived by John Butler's cousin, John Butler, 17th Earl of Ormonde.

Following the second Duke's attainder, the Ormond estate was administrated by the Forfeited Estates Commissioners. With the permission of the Parliament of Ireland, the estate was purchased in 1721 by the second Duke's brother, Charles, the Earl of Arran. Arran died childless in 1758. The estate passed to his unmarried sister Lady Amelia Butler, who held it for about two years. On her death in 1760, the estate was inherited by John Butler, the subject of this article.

Marriage 
John Butler married Bridget Stacey on 19 April 1763, but the marriage was childless.

Death and succession 
He died on 24 June 1766 and was buried at Kilcash. He was succeeded by his cousin Walter, the son of his uncle John, who unknowingly became de jure the 16th Earl of Ormond.

Notes and references

Notes

Citations

Sources 

 
 
  – L to M (for Magennis)
  – N to R (for Ormond)
  – Eardley of Spalding to Goojerat (for Fingall)
  – Scotland and Ireland
 
  – (for timeline)
 
  – Viscounts (for John Butler under Butler, Viscount Mountgarrett)
  – House of Lords
  – From the revolution to the death of George II

Ormonde, Walter Butler, 15th Earl of
John
Earls of Ormond (Ireland)
Year of birth unknown